Teratozephyrus is a genus of butterflies in the family Lycaenidae.(Theclini) It is an East
Palearctic (China, Taiwan, North Indochina) species associated with Quercus.

Species
Teratozephyrus arisanus (Wileman, 1909) Taiwan, Yunnan.Includes T. a. picquenardi (Oberthür, 1914) and T. a. kachinus Koiwaya, 2000  Myanmar
Teratozephyrus zhejiangensis Chou & Tong, 1994 Zhejiang
Teratozephyrus hecale (Leech, 1894) Tibet, West China.
Teratozephyrus chibahieyukii Fujioka, 1994 China, Szechwan, Kuan-Hsien, north west of Cheng-tu.
Teratozephyrus florianii Bozano, 1996 = Hayashikeia florianii  Bozano, 1996  China, W. Sichuan, Kangding.
Teratozephyrus hinomaru Fujioka, 1994 China, Szechwan, Nanchuan, Chin-fo-shan, 1600-1800 m.
Teratozephyrus kimurai Koiwaya, 2002 Vietnam
Teratozephyrus muroyai Fujioka, 2003 = Teratozephyrus kimurai
Teratozephyrus nuwai Koiwaya, 1996 China Gansu, Tianshui (1700m).
Teratozephyrus tsukiyamahiroshii Fujioka, 1994 Vietnam

References

 
Theclini
Lycaenidae genera